The Battle of Elgsö took place on September 30, 1789 during Russo-Swedish War (1788–90), Sweden won over the Russian Empire.

In September 1789 a Swedish force in command of Gustaf Mauritz Armfelt numbering 4,000 men were sent towards Barösund where the Swedes and Russians had actively been fighting each other with ships of various sizes. The Russians threatened the Swedes with a landing operation, whereas Armefelt was supposed to interrupt their plans. In 30 September he launched an attack with 500 men on the Russians stationed at the island of Elgsö consisting of 10 cannons and 440 men under the general command of James Trevenen. In the battle the Swedes lost 12 killed and 46 wounded, the Russians had about 150 killed and wounded and 52 captured. The Russian field artillery was captured and they had to evacuate the island and no longer posed a great threat to the Swedes.

References

Elgsö
1789 in Europe
Elgsö
Elgsö
Elgsö
History of Uusimaa